The following outline is provided as an overview of and topical guide to Spain:

Spain – sovereign state located on the Iberian Peninsula in southwestern Europe. Spanish territory also includes the Balearic Islands in the Mediterranean, the Canary Islands in the Atlantic Ocean off the African coast, three exclaves in North Africa, Ceuta, Melilla, and Peñón de Vélez de la Gomera that border Morocco, and the islands and peñones (rocks) of Alborán, Chafarinas, Alhucemas, and Perejil. Spain is a democracy organized in the form of a parliamentary government under a constitutional monarchy. It is a developed country with the 13th largest economy in the world. It is a member of the European Union, United Nations, NATO, OECD, WTO and many other international organizations.

Spain Population:

2018: 46,960,000

2019: 46,450,000

2020: 46,460,000

2021: 46,420,000

General reference

 Pronunciation:
English 
Spanish:)
 Common English country name: Spain
 Official English country name:  The Kingdom of Spain or Spain
 Common endonym: España
 Official endonym: Reino de España, España
 Adjectival:  Spanish
 Demonym:  Spaniard
 Etymology: Name of Spain
 International rankings of Spain
 ISO country codes:  ES, ESP, 724
 ISO region codes:  See ISO 3166-2:ES
 Internet country code top-level domain:  .es
 International Direct Dialing uses the prefix +34. Then a first digit 9 or 8 indicates a fixed landline, 6 or 7 are for mobile cellphones

Geography of Spain

Geography of Spain
 Spain is a:
 Country
 Developed country
 Nation state
 Sovereign state
 Member State of the European Union
 Location:
 Northern Hemisphere, on the Prime Meridian
 Eurasia
 Europe
 Southern Europe
 Western Europe
 Iberian Peninsula – Spain occupies most of this peninsula, sharing it with Portugal
 Time zones:
 Canary Islands – Western European Time (UTC+00), Western European Summer Time (UTC+01)
 Rest of Spain – Central European Time (UTC+01), Central European Summer Time (UTC+02)
 Extreme points of Spain
 High:  Teide on Tenerife  - highest point in Canary Islands        Mulhacén  - highest point in continental Spain
 Low:  North Atlantic Ocean and Mediterranean Sea 0 m
 Land boundaries:  1,918 km
 1,214 km
 623 km
 64 km
 16 km
 1 km, not recognized by Spain
 Coastline:  4,964 km
 Population of Spain: 46,063,500 (January 2008)  - 28th most populous country

 Area of Spain: 504,030 km2
 Second largest country in Western Europe (behind France)
 Altitude:
 Average altitude: 650 m
 Rank: second highest country in Europe (behind Switzerland)
 Atlas of Spain

Environment of Spain

 Geology of Spain
 Climate of Spain
 Renewable energy in Spain
 Environmental issues in Spain
 Biosphere reserves in Spain
 National parks of Spain
 Sites of Community Importance in Spain
 Wildlife of Spain
 Fauna of Spain
 Birds of Spain
 Mammals of Spain

Natural geographic features of Spain
 Beaches in Spain
 Glaciers of Spain
 Islands of Spain
 Lakes of Spain
 Mountains of Spain
 Volcanoes in Spain
 Rivers of Spain
 Waterfalls of Spain
 Valleys of Spain
 World Heritage Sites in Spain

Regions of Spain

Ecological regions of Spain

List of ecoregions in Spain
 Ecoregions in Spain

Administrative divisions of Spain

Administrative divisions of Spain
 Autonomous communities of Spain
 Provinces of Spain
 Municipalities of Spain

Autonomous communities of Spain
Autonomous communities of Spain – each has its own parliament and government

 By name

 By statistic
 Spanish autonomous communities by area
 Spanish autonomous communities by population

Autonomous cities of Spain 
Autonomous cities of Spain – less autonomous than the autonomous communities, but with more autonomy than Spain's other cities

Other territory 
 Spanish exclaves:
 Ceuta
 Melilla
 Llívia
 Places of sovereignty near Morocco, consisting of:
 Islas Chafarinas
 Peñón de Alhucemas
 Peñón de Vélez de la Gomera
 Isla de Alborán
 Isla Perejil

Provinces of Spain

Provinces of Spain
 Spanish provinces by area
 Spanish provinces by coastline
 Spanish provinces by population
 Spanish provinces by name:

Comarcas of Spain 
Comarcas of Spain
 Comarcas of Aragon
 Comarcas of Asturias
 Comarques of Catalonia
 Comarques of the Valencian Community

Municipalities of Spain
Municipalities of Spain
 Capital of Spain: Madrid
 Metropolitan areas in Spain
 List of municipalities (cities) of Spain – Spain's approximately 8100 municipalities comprise the basic level of Spanish local government
 Autonomous cities of Spain
 Ranked lists of Spanish municipalities

Demography of Spain

Demographics of Spain

Government and politics of Spain
Politics of Spain
 Form of government: Constitutional monarchy
 Capital of Spain: Madrid
 Anarchism in Spain
 Elections in Spain
 Political parties in Spain
Partido Popular or PP Mainstream Centre-Right associated with the main Employers Organization and clerics
Partido Socialista Obrero Español mainstream social-democrats linked to Unión General de Trabajadores trade union and the Confederación Empresarial de Economia Social
Podemos, a recently formed left-wing populist party
Citizens (Ciudadanos, "Cs") a recently established liberal and unionist party
 Political parties in Catalonia
 Liberalism and radicalism in Spain
 Social Security in Spain
 Taxation in Spain
 Corruption in Spain

Monarchy of Spain 
Monarchy of Spain
 Head of state: King of Spain, Felipe VI
 List of heads of state of Spain
 List of titles and honours of the Spanish Crown
 List of titles and honours of Felipe VI of Spain
 Line of succession to the Spanish Throne
 Monarchs of Spain family tree
 Christmas Eve National Speech
 Coat of arms of the King of Spain
 Royal Household of Spain
 Spanish Royal Family
 Spanish royal sites
 Spanish nobility
 Annus horribilis
 Bourbon claim to the Spanish throne
 Caballerizo mayor
 Camarera mayor de Palacio
 Chamber of Peers (Spain)
 Crown of Aragon
 Descendants of Charles III of Spain
 Coat of arms of the Prince of Asturias
 Ancestry of Felipe VI of Spain
 Gentilhombres de cámara con ejercicio
 Imperator totius Hispaniae
 Ancestry of Juan Carlos I of Spain
 Kingdom of Gibraltar
 List of titles and honours of Leonor, Princess of Asturias
 Queen Letizia of Spain
 Line of succession to the Spanish throne
 List of titles and honours of Juan Carlos I of Spain
 List of titles and honours of Queen Letizia of Spain
 Mayordomo mayor
 Mayordomos de semana
 Nóos case
 Patrimonio Nacional
 Royal descendants of John William Friso
 Royal Household and Heritage of the Crown of Spain
 Royal Standard of Spain
 List of titles and honours of Queen Sofía of Spain
 Sumiller de Corps

Branches of the government of Spain

Government of Spain

Executive branch of the government of Spain
 Head of state: King of Spain, Felipe VI
 List of heads of state of Spain
 Head of government: Prime Minister of Spain (Presidente del Gobierno), Pedro Sánchez Pérez-Castejón
 List of prime ministers of Spain
 Deputy Prime Minister of Spain
 Second Deputy Prime Minister of Spain
 Cabinet of Spain (Council of Ministers)

Legislative branch of the government of Spain
 Parliament of Spain – bicameral legislature of Spain, consisting of:
 Upper house: Senate of Spain
 Lower house: Congress of Deputies (Spain)

Judicial branch of the government of Spain
Spanish judicial system
 General Council of the Judicial Power of Spain
 Constitutional Court of Spain
 Supreme Court of Spain

Foreign relations of Spain

Foreign relations of Spain
 Diplomatic missions in Spain
 Diplomatic missions of Spain
 Centro Nacional de Inteligencia

International organization membership
The Kingdom of Spain is a member of:

African Development Bank Group (AfDB) (nonregional member)
Arctic Council (observer)
Asian Development Bank (ADB) (nonregional member)
Australia Group
Bank for International Settlements (BIS)
Central American Bank for Economic Integration (BCIE)
Central American Integration System (SICA) (observer)
Confederation of European Paper Industries (CEPI)
Council of Europe (CE)
Economic and Monetary Union (EMU)
Euro-Atlantic Partnership Council (EAPC)
European Bank for Reconstruction and Development (EBRD)
European Investment Bank (EIB)
European Organization for Nuclear Research (CERN)
European Space Agency (ESA)
European Union (EU)
Food and Agriculture Organization (FAO)
Inter-American Development Bank (IADB)
International Atomic Energy Agency (IAEA)
International Bank for Reconstruction and Development (IBRD)
International Chamber of Commerce (ICC)
International Civil Aviation Organization (ICAO)
International Criminal Court (ICCt)
International Criminal Police Organization (Interpol)
International Development Association (IDA)
International Energy Agency (IEA)
International Federation of Red Cross and Red Crescent Societies (IFRCS)
International Finance Corporation (IFC)
International Fund for Agricultural Development (IFAD)
International Hydrographic Organization (IHO)
International Labour Organization (ILO)
International Maritime Organization (IMO)
International Mobile Satellite Organization (IMSO)
International Monetary Fund (IMF)
International Olympic Committee (IOC)
International Organization for Migration (IOM)
International Organization for Standardization (ISO)
International Red Cross and Red Crescent Movement (ICRM)
International Telecommunication Union (ITU)

International Telecommunications Satellite Organization (ITSO)
International Trade Union Confederation (ITUC)
Inter-Parliamentary Union (IPU)
Latin American Integration Association (LAIA) (observer)
Multilateral Investment Guarantee Agency (MIGA)
Nonaligned Movement (NAM) (guest)
North Atlantic Treaty Organization (NATO)
Nuclear Energy Agency (NEA)
Nuclear Suppliers Group (NSG)
Organisation for Economic Co-operation and Development (OECD)
Organization for Security and Cooperation in Europe (OSCE)
Organisation for the Prohibition of Chemical Weapons (OPCW)
Organization of American States (OAS) (observer)
Paris Club
Permanent Court of Arbitration (PCA)
Schengen Convention
Southeast European Cooperative Initiative (SECI) (observer)
Unión Latina
United Nations (UN)
United Nations Conference on Trade and Development (UNCTAD)
United Nations Educational, Scientific, and Cultural Organization (UNESCO)
United Nations High Commissioner for Refugees (UNHCR)
United Nations Industrial Development Organization (UNIDO)
United Nations Interim Force in Lebanon (UNIFIL)
United Nations Mission in the Central African Republic and Chad (MINURCAT)
United Nations Organization Mission in the Democratic Republic of the Congo (MONUC)
United Nations Relief and Works Agency for Palestine Refugees in the Near East (UNRWA)
Universal Postal Union (UPU)
Western European Union (WEU)
World Confederation of Labour (WCL)
World Customs Organization (WCO)
World Federation of Trade Unions (WFTU)
World Health Organization (WHO)
World Intellectual Property Organization (WIPO)
World Meteorological Organization (WMO)
World Tourism Organization (UNWTO)
World Trade Organization (WTO)
Zangger Committee (ZC)

Law and order in Spain
Law of Spain
 Crime in Spain
 Terrorism in Spain
 ETA
 GRAPO
 11 March 2004 Madrid train bombings
 Human rights in Spain
 Civil unions in Spain
 LGBT rights in Spain
 Same-sex marriage in Spain
 Freedom of religion in Spain
 Law enforcement in Spain
 Laws of Spain
 Capital punishment in Spain
 Constitution of Spain
 Spanish Political Reform Act 1977
 Spanish Constitution of 1978
 Amendments to the Spanish Constitution of 1978
 Historical Memory Law – recognizes the victims on both sides of the Spanish Civil War, gives rights to the victims and the descendants of victims of the Civil War and the subsequent dictatorship of General Francisco Franco, and formally condemns the Franco Regime
 Spanish referendum on the European Constitution

Military of Spain
Military of Spain
 Command
 Commander-in-chief:
 Ministry of Defence of Spain
 Forces
 Army of Spain
 Tanks in the Spanish Army
 Navy of Spain
 Air Force of Spain
 Spanish Legion
 Special forces of Spain
 Military history of Spain
 Military ranks of Spain

Local government in Spain
Local government in Spain
 List of Spanish regional governments
 List of Spanish regional legislatures

History of Spain
History of Spain
 Timeline of Spanish history

History of Spain by period 
 Prehistoric Iberia
 Timeline of pre-Roman Iberian history
 Carthaginian Iberia
 Hispania
 Timeline of the history of Roman Hispania
 Spain in the Middle Ages
 Visigothic Kingdom
 al-Andalus
 Umayyad conquest of Hispania
 Reconquista
 Habsburg Spain
 Spanish Inquisition
 Enlightenment Spain
 Mid-nineteenth century Spain
 Spanish confiscation
 First Spanish Republic
 Spain under the Restoration
 Second Spanish Republic
 Spanish Civil War
 Spain under Franco
 Modern Spain

History of Spain by region

By autonomous community 

 History of Andalusia
 History of Aragon
 History of Asturias
 History of the Balearic Islands
 History of Basque Country
 History of the Canary Islands
 History of Cantabria
 History of Castilla-La Mancha
 History of Castile and León
 History of Catalonia
 History of Extremadura
 History of Galicia
 History of La Rioja
 History of the Community of Madrid
 History of the Region of Murcia
 History of Navarre
 History of the Valencian Community

By city 
 History of Madrid
 History of Barcelona
 History of Valencia
 History of Seville
 History of Zaragoza
 History of Málaga
 History of Murcia
 History of Palma
 History of Las Palmas
 History of Bilbao
 History of Alicante

History of Spain by subject 
 Chivalry in Spain
 Economic history of Spain
 Literature in Medieval Spain
 Military history of Spain
 List of Spanish wars
Spanish knights orders
 List of ships of the line of Spain
 List of battleships of Spain
 Spanish aircraft carrier Príncipe de Asturias
 Spanish ship Juan Carlos I (L61)
 Spanish Armada
 Spanish Armada in Ireland
 Religious history of Spain

Culture of Spain

Culture of Spain
 Cuisine of Spain
 Paella
 Festivals in Spain
Fiestas of International Tourist Interest of Spain
Fiestas of National Tourist Interest of Spain
 Media in Spain
 National symbols of Spain
 Coat of arms of Spain
Coats of arms of the autonomous communities of Spain
 Flag of Spain
Flags of the autonomous communities of Spain
 National anthem of Spain (Marcha Real)
Anthems of the autonomous communities of Spain
 National motto: Plus Ultra
 Prostitution in Spain
 Public holidays in Spain
 Records of Spain
 Scouting in Spain
 World Heritage Sites in Spain

Art in Spain
Art in Spain
 Cave of Altamira and Paleolithic Cave Art of Northern Spain
 Rock art of the Iberian Mediterranean Basin
 Rock art of the Iberian Southern Tip
 Television in Spain
 Spanish Golden Age
Spanish Baroque Painting
 Spanish Renaissance

Architecture of Spain
Architecture of Spain
 By location
 Architecture of Barcelona
 Architecture of Madrid
Romanesque churches in Madrid
 Architecture of Cantabria
 By period
 Spanish Romanesque
 Mudéjar style
 Spanish Gothic architecture
 Herrerian
 Spanish Renaissance architecture
 Plateresque
 Spanish Baroque
 Rococo in Spain
 Modernisme
 By type
 Castles in Spain
 Cathedrals in Spain
Missing landmarks in Spain

Cinema of Spain
Cinema of Spain
 Spanish films
 Spanish directors
 Luis Buñuel – first Spanish director to achieve universal recognition
 Pedro Almodóvar – achieved universal recognition in the 1980s
 Segundo de Chomón
 Florián Rey
 Luis García Berlanga
 Juan Antonio Bardem
 Carlos Saura
 Julio Médem
 Alejandro Amenábar

Dance in Spain
 Jota
 Flamenco
 Sardana
 Sevillanas

Literature of Spain
Literature of Spain — Castilian (Spanish) literature
 By genre
 Spanish poetry
 Spanish comics
 By region
 Basque literature
 Catalan literature
 Galician literature

Music of Spain
Music of Spain
 By genre
 Spanish opera
 Spanish folk music
 Flamenco
 Catalan rumba
 Spanish rock
 Spanish hip hop
 By region
 Music of Andalusia
 Music of Aragon
 Music of the Balearic Islands
 Music of the Basque
 Music of the Canary Islands
 Music of Castile, Madrid and León
 Music of Catalonia
 Music of Extremadura
 Music of Galicia, Cantabria and Asturias
 Music of Murcia
 Music of Navarre and La Rioja
 Music of Valencia
 Benidorm International Song Festival - Festivals
 Spain in the Eurovision Song Contest

Painting in Spain
 Spanish painters
 Alonso Cano
 Juan Carreño de Miranda
 Ramon Casas i Carbó
 Claudio Coello
 Salvador Dalí
 Mariano Fortuny
 Francisco Goya
 El Greco (born in Creta).
 Bartolomé Esteban Murillo
 Pablo Picasso
 José de Ribera
 Santiago Rusiñol
 Enrique Simonet
 Joaquín Sorolla
 Diego Velázquez
 Ignacio Zuloaga
 Francisco de Zurbarán

Sculpture in Spain
 Lady of Elche
 Lady of Baza

Language in Spain 
 Languages of Spain
 Spanish language
 History of the Spanish language
 Spanish dialects
 Aragonese
 Aranese (Occitan)
 Asturian
 Basque
 Catalan/Valencian
 Galician
 Leonese

People of Spain 
Spanish people (or People of Spain)
 Regional ethnic groups:
 Andalusian people
 Aragonese people
 Asturian people
 Balearic people
 Basque people
 Canarian people
 Cantabrian people
 Castilian people
 Catalan people
 Extremaduran people
 Galician people
 Leonese people
 Valencian people
 Other groups:
 Afro-Spanish
 Chinese people in Spain
 Jews in Spain
 Romani people in Spain

Religion and belief systems in Spain 
 Irreligion in Spain
 Religion in Spain
 Monasteries in Spain
 Religions in Spain
 Bahá'í Faith in Spain
 Christianity in Spain
 Catholicism in Spain
 Protestantism in Spain
 Hinduism in Spain
 Islam in Spain
 Ahmadiyya in Spain
 Judaism in Spain
 Neopaganism in Spain
 Odinist Community of Spain — Ásatrú

Sports in Spain

Sports in Spain
 Football in Spain
 Football clubs in Spain
 Mind sports in Spain
 Chess in Spain
 Spanish Chess Championship
 Spain at the Olympics

Economy and infrastructure of Spain
Economy of Spain
 Economic rank, by nominal GDP (2011): 12th (twelfth)
 Agriculture in Spain
 Banking in Spain
 National Bank of Spain
 Companies of Spain
Currency of Spain: Euro (see also: Euro topics)
ISO 4217: EUR
 Royal Mint
 Spanish euro coins
 Spanish peseta
 Economic history of Spain
 Energy in Spain
 Energy policy of Spain
 Oil industry in Spain
 Health care in Spain
 Mining in Spain
 Social Security in Spain
 Spain Stock Exchange
 Tourism in Spain
 Water supply and sanitation in Spain

Communications in Spain 
Communications in Spain
 Internet in Spain
 Television stations in Spain
 Radio stations in Spain
 Spanish newspapers
 Postal codes in Spain

Transport in Spain 
Transport in Spain
 Air transport in Spain
 Airports in Spain
 EADS CASA – defunct aircraft manufacturer
 Rail transport in Spain
 Rapid transit in Spain 
 List of town tramway systems in Spain 
 History of rail transport in Spain
 AVE, Spanish High Speed
 RENFE, National Network of the Spanish Railways
Cercanías, commuter rail services
 FEVE, Narrow Gauge Railways
 Euskotren Trena
 Ferrocarrils de la Generalitat de Catalunya
 Ferrocarrils de la Generalitat Valenciana
 Serveis Ferroviaris de Mallorca
 Talgo – train manufacturer
 Road transport in Spain
 Roads in Spain (carreteras)
List of national roads in Spain (carreteras nacionales)
 Highways in Spain (autopistas and autovías)
 Vehicle registration plates of Spain
 Road vehicle manufacturers
 Car manufacturers
 SEAT
 Motorcycle manufacturers
 Montesa Honda – Spanish subsidiary of Honda, manufactures motorcycles and bicycles
 History of road transport in Spain
 Abadal automobile
 Biscuter automobile
 Bultaco – defunct motorcycle manufacturer
 Hispano-Suiza – defunct car manufacturer
 Pegaso – defunct car manufacturer

Education in Spain 
Education in Spain
 Spanish universities
 List of universities in Spain (organized by autonomous community)

Health in Spain 
 Healthcare in Spain
 Hospitals in Spain

See also

Spain
List of international rankings
List of Spain-related topics
Member state of the European Union
Member state of the North Atlantic Treaty Organization
Member state of the United Nations
Outline of Europe
Outline of geography

References

External links

 Overviews

Encyclopædia Britannica's Spain Portal site
IberiaNature A guide to the environment, geography, climate, wildlife, natural history and landscape of Spain
Library of Congress Spain Country Series site
Local Spanish news and features
Maps of Spain: satellite images, relief maps, outlines and themed maps of Spanish autonomous communities, provinces and municipalities
Spain: CIA World Factbook entry — updated in May 2006
Spain: The Economist Country Briefings entry

 Government

administracion.es e-government Portal
Agencia Estatal de Administración Tributaria — Tax Agency
Casa Real.es - Spanish Royal Family
Congreso de los Diputados — Congress of Deputies
Dates in Spanish history
El Senado - Senate
La Moncloa.es — Prime Minister

 Other

INEBase — National Institute of Statistics
Languages of Spain
Ministerio de Asuntos Exteriores Ministry of Foreign Affairs
Official Website of Tourism in Spain
History of Spain Primary history documents

Spain